Zeng Jingsheng (born Aug 20, 1954) is a Chinese oil painter. He was born in Huizhou, Guangdong. He is a member of the China Artists Association. He has been vice chairman of the Shenzhen Artists Association.

In 1984, Zeng was admitted to the Guangdong Artists Association. In 1990, he was admitted to the Chinese Artists Association. He was the first artist from Shenzhen to be admitted to the Chinese Artists Association.

Work of art

Exhibition

References 

1954 births
Living people
20th-century Chinese painters
21st-century Chinese painters
Artists from Guangdong
People from Huizhou